Cresta Run (1924 – 1939) was a British Thoroughbred racehorse and broodmare. As a two-year-old in 1926 she showed steady improvement, winning two of her i races including the valuable Imperial Produce Stakes. On her three-year-old debut she recorded a very impressive win in the 1000 Guineas but failed to reproduce her form in two subsequent races over longer distances. She had little immediate success as a broodmare but had a long-term influence on the breed though her daughter Gold Race.

Background
Cresta Run was a bay mare bred and owned by Giles Loder who owned the Eyresfield Stud in County Kildare. Throughout her racing career she was trained by Peter Gilpin at his Clarehaven Stable in Newmarket, Suffolk. She was described as a "charming filly" with "well-developed quarters" and an "intelligent head".

She was from the sixth crop of foals sired by the unbeaten champion, Hurry On, making her a representative of the Godolphin Arabian sire line. Hurry On sired numerous other major winners including Captain Cuttle, Coronach, Call Boy, Pennycomequick and Precipitation. Cresta Run's dam Bridgemount also produced Foxbridge who was exported to New Zealand where he sired Hi Jinx and Foxzami.

Racing career

1926: two-year-old season
Cresta Run began her racing career by finishing unplaced behind Book Law in the Queen Mary Stakes at Royal Ascot in June. She was also unplaced in the National Breeders' Produce Stakes and then ran third in the Prince of Wales's Plate before recording her first success in the Highclere Nursery Handicap at Newbury Racecourse. On 8 October Cresta Run carried 127 pounds in the £3,797 Imperial Produce Stakes at Kempton Park Racecourse and won by three lengths from eleven opponents in a time of 1:13.00. At Newmarket Racecourse in later that month she was matched against male opposition in the Middle Park Stakes but finished uplaced behind the colt Call Boy.

Cresta Run ended the season with earnings of £4,880.

1927: three-year-old season
The 114th running of 1000 Guineas over the Rowley Mile on 29 April attracted a field of twenty-eight runners and Cresta Run, ridden by Arthur Balding, started at odds of 10/1. She appeared somewhat nervous and agitated in the paddock before the race but started well and immediately assumed the lead. She was never seriously challenged and won the race with "ridiculous ease" by two lengths from Book Law and Endowment, who dead-heated for second place. Her winning time of 1:38.0 was 0.2 seconds faster than that recorded by Adam's Apple in the 2000 Guineas over the same course.

In the Oaks Stakes over one and a half miles at Epsom Racecourse Cresta Run started 3/1 second favourite behind Book Law. The large, noisy crowd, high temperatures and three false starts led her to become very upset and after being left behind the other fillies at the start she finished last of the sixteen runners in a race won by Beam. Later that summer she was beaten by Cinq a Sept in the Irish Oaks.

Assessment and honours
In their book, A Century of Champions, based on the Timeform rating system, John Randall and Tony Morris rated Cresta Run an "average" winner of the 1000 Guineas.

Breeding record
Cresta Run was retired from racing to become a broodmare. Gold Race had little success as a racehorse but had considerable influence as a broodmare, with her female-line descendants including Jupiter Island, Precocious and Grand Lodge.

Gold Race, a brown filly, foaled in 1930, sired by Colorado
Breadcrust, a bay colt sired by Manna
Windy Ridge, chestnut gelding, 1937, sired by Apelle (also called Cresta Run gelding)

Cresta Run died in 1939 after foaling stillborn twins.

Pedigree

References

1924 racehorse births
1939 racehorse deaths
Racehorses bred in the United Kingdom
Racehorses trained in the United Kingdom
Thoroughbred family 14-b
1000 Guineas winners
Godolphin Arabian sire line